The Enemy Within is an American drama television series created by Ken Woodruff, which aired on NBC from February 25 to May 20, 2019. The series was cancelled after one season on May 30, 2019.

Plot
In 2015, Erica Shepherd is the CIA Deputy Director of Operations. When Russian master terrorist Mikhail Vassily Tal threatens her daughter Hannah, Erica is forced to reveal the names of four agents: Steven Haibach, Brian Lanich, Desiree Villareal, and Laine Heffron. The agents are killed, and Erica is arrested by FBI agent Will Keaton and sentenced to 15 consecutive life sentences without possibility of parole. Three years later, Tal strikes again, and Keaton is ordered to bring Erica out of ADX Florence to join the hunt for Tal and his growing network of spies.

Cast and characters

Main
 Jennifer Carpenter as Erica J. Shepherd, a brilliant codebreaker and former CIA Deputy Director of Operations, serving life in prison for espionage and treason. She is recruited by Will Keaton to stop terrorist Mikhail Tal.
 Morris Chestnut as Will Keaton, the FBI special agent in charge of the hunt for Tal, and a rising star in the FBI Counterintelligence Division. The agent who arrested Shepherd, he reluctantly enlists her help in hopes of avenging his fiancée Laine.
 Raza Jaffrey as Daniel Zain, an FBI interrogator and Keaton's confidant.
 Kelli Garner as Kate Ryan, a technical analyst with the FBI Cyber Division.
 Cassandra Freeman as Jaquelyn Pettigrew, a training instructor at the FBI Academy.
 Noah Mills as Jason Bragg, an FBI agent and former Army Ranger.

Recurring
 Lev Gorn as Mikhail Vassily Tal, a former Russian SVR agent and the elusive mastermind behind a series of terrorist attacks against the United States with a network of hidden operatives. Until "Decoded," only his voice is heard (provided by an uncredited Alex Feldman).
 Coral Peña as Anna Cruz, a junior CIA analyst who works as a mole for Tal.
 James Carpinello as Anthony Cabrera, the CIA's new Deputy Director of Operations.
 Sophia Gennusa as Hannah Shepherd, Erica's daughter.
 Noah Bean as Christopher Shepherd, Erica's ex-husband.

Guest
 Edward Akrout as International Assassin Aslan Aksoy. 
 John Finn as Richard Bregman, the FBI's Assistant Director of Counterintelligence and Keaton's superior.
 Florencia Lozano as Elizabeth Cordova, the Deputy Director of National Intelligence.
 Kathleen McNenny as Grace Molinero, the Deputy Director of the Federal Bureau of Investigation who distrusts Shepherd.
 Pawel Szajda as Victor Nemec, one of Tal's top lieutenants who was responsible for killing Steven Haibach and Desiree Villareal. He was later killed by Anna Cruz.
 Chelsea Watts as Laine Heffron, a CIA agent and Keaton's fiancée who was killed in a plane crash orchestrated by Tal.
 Robert Gossett as Thomas Heffron, Laine's father.
 Michael O'Keefe as Paul Backus, a National Security Advisor that is on Tal's side.
 Ana Kayne as Carla Mendoza, Tal's top lieutenant and confidant.
 Michael Braun as Dr. Alan Novak, a physician in Tal's organization.
 Dale Pavinsky as Alexander Chigorin, Tal's senior lieutenant who was responsible for Laine's death and was recruited by Tal when he was just a teenager.
 Michael James Shaw as Desmond Visser, a commando-turned-independent security analyst who only met Tal through transaction.
 Margaret Colin as Evelyn Bell, a former CIA black ops-turned-congresswoman from Florida who used Erica's conviction to start off her political career.

Episodes

Production

Development
On January 22, 2018, it was announced that NBC had given the production a pilot order. The pilot was written by Ken Woodruff who was also expected to executive produce alongside Vernon Sanders. Production companies involved with the pilot were set to include Universal Television. On February 16, 2018, it was reported that Mark Pellington would direct the pilot episode. On May 7, 2018, it was announced that NBC had given the production a series order. It was also reported that Pellington would act as an executive producer for the series. A few days later, it was announced that the series would premiere as a mid-season replacement in the spring of 2019. On December 18, 2018, it was announced that the series would premiere on February 25, 2019 and air weekly on Mondays during the 10 PM time slot. On May 30, 2019, NBC canceled the series after a single season.

Casting
In February 2018, it was announced that Raza Jaffrey, Jennifer Carpenter, and Morris Chestnut had been cast in lead roles in the pilot. In March 2018, it was reported that Cassandra Freeman and Kelli Garner had joined the main cast. On June 28, 2018, it was announced that Noah Mills had been cast in a series regular role. In December 2018, it was reported that Coral Peña and Robert Gossett would appear in a recurring capacity.

Filming
In October 2018, filming for the series took place at Bergen Community College in Bergen County, New Jersey.
Scenes are also shot on soundstages installed in the East Rutherford Meadowlands Arena, former home to the New Jersey Devils and New Jersey Nets, now known as the Brooklyn Nets.

Reception

Ratings

Critical response
On review aggregator Rotten Tomatoes, the series holds an approval rating of 43% based on 14 reviews, with an average rating of 5.33/10. The website's critical consensus reads, "Despite a set of stellar performances led by the capable Jennifer Carpenter, The Enemy Within stumbles into an overly formulaic narrative that fails to produce any real spark." On Metacritic, it has a weighted average score of 55 out of 100, based on 10 critics, indicating "mixed or average reviews".

References

External links

2010s American drama television series
2019 American television series debuts
2019 American television series endings
Television series about the Central Intelligence Agency
English-language television shows
Television series about the Federal Bureau of Investigation
NBC original programming
Television series by Universal Television
Television shows filmed in New Jersey
Television shows set in Virginia